Casad Dam is a concrete arch dam in Bremerton, Kitsap County, Washington), built starting in 1955 and completed in 1957.

The dam is Kitsap County's only major water diversion structure, impounding Union River to form a reservoir that is the source of over half of Bremerton's municipal water supply.

Bremerton owns 95% of the land in its  watershed, and the Union River reservoir behind Casad Dam holds  of water. The city is unusual in drawing most of its water supply from an open air source, the reservoir, which can occasionally be affected by algal blooms.

The dam's intake tower underwent seismic retrofit in 2012 to withstand a 0.78 g peak acceleration in a maximum credible earthquake from the Seattle Fault which runs about four miles (7 km) away, on the north side of Green Mountain.

References

Buildings and structures in Kitsap County, Washington
Arch dams
Dams in Washington (state)
Dams completed in 1957
1957 establishments in Washington (state)